Febbre da cavallo (Horse Fever) is a 1976 Italian comedy film directed by Steno and starring Gigi Proietti. It was shown as part of a retrospective on Italian comedy at the 67th Venice International Film Festival.

Plot
Bruno Fioretti, known as "Mandrake", is an inveterate gambler who never misses a day at the horse racing track in Rome. He is always at the track together with his friends Armando Pellicci, known as "Er Pomata" due to his use of hair gel, and Felice Roversi. They always bet on the wrong horses and they always end up being penniless.

One day the three go to the Agnano Hippodrome to watch the race, but their horse loses. Back home, Gabriella, Mandrake's girlfriend, tired of the constant shortcomings of her partner, asks for advice from a fortune teller, who, without any purpose, induces her to bet on a Tris race. The three horses indicated by the cards and by Mandrake himself (Soldatino, King and D'Artagnan) are among the worst in circulation; above all Soldatino, the horse owned by lawyer De Marchis, a betting partner of the three friends.

Witnessing a horse race in Cesena, Mandrake seems so determined to follow Gabriella's advice, but is convinced by Pomata to focus on another horse (Antonello da Messina, the superfavorite). The prediction of the fortune teller, however, is correct: Soldatino, King and D'Artagnan win the race and the astonished Mandrake, to save his relationship with Gabriella, shows her a false play by filling it with vain promises for the future. Furious with Pomata for his incorrect prediction, Mandrake begins to wait for him at home, together with "Er Ventresca", a creditor who has long been waiting to collect from Pomata 300.000 lire, managing to find him when he has set up the burial chamber for the late grandmother in her home. The death of the grandmother is, actually, a staging designed by Pomata to escape the numerous creditors. In the end, the three friends are forced to devise a "super-mandrakata", as Mandrake defines his brilliant scams, together with Pomata, Felice, De Marchis and her friend Mafalda.

Given the extraordinary vigour found by Soldatino, who has begun to brilliantly win all the races in which he competes, the cronies decide that Mandrake will replace, in the imminent Grand Prix of the Aces of Tor di Valle, the unbeatable Jean-Louis Rossini, driver of the only true rival of De Marchis' horse, Bernadette, to slow it down and win by betting on Soldatino, whose stake is still very high. In this way, De Marchis also has the opportunity to triumph over the eternal rival Conte Dallara, owner of Bernadette, who given the rise of Soldatino has decided to bet on the sure win, since Rossini has never lost a race. The first part of the plan succeeds perfectly, with Mandrake ready to do anything to lose, and Pomata who, disguised as a police commissioner, kidnaps Rossini making him believe he is at the centre of a plot, taking him to a farmhouse outside the city.

Shortly before the race, the former driver of Soldatino, Stelvio Mazza, fed up with the lawyer de Marchis who does not decide to pay his arrears, refuses to drive the horse, and in his place is self-candid Pomata, who is a former jockey with a regular license. The race starts and everything seems to go in the right direction until Mandrake, taken by the impetus of the competition and trying not to make the farce evident, forgets to lose and leads Bernadette closer and closer to Soldatino, who is in the first position; after a head-to-head between Mandrake and Pomata, Bernadette manages to get the better, being led to victory by Mandrake, arousing the ire of friends and lawyer.

The whole gang ends up in court and here Mandrake tries to dissuade the judge with a gruelling speech on "who is" the horse-player in a broad sense and then ends with the request for total mental infirmity. Gabriella reveals that she secretly played the winning Tris, thus making the money for the win, but just when the sentence seems obvious now, it turns out that even the Judge is a hardened bettor and everyone is acquitted. Gabriella finally manages to get married by Mandrake, who, with her tacit consent, escapes during the honeymoon to go to the hippodrome of Cesena.

Cast
 Gigi Proietti as Bruno Fioretti, 'Mandrake', background actor
 Enrico Montesano as Armando Pellicci, 'Er Pomata', unemployed and gambler
 Catherine Spaak as Gabriella, Mandrake's girlfriend bar owner
 Mario Carotenuto as attorney De Marchis
 Francesco De Rosa as Felice Roversi a franelero
 Gigi Ballista as Conte Dallara, stable owner
 Maria Teresa Albani as Fortune-teller
 Nikki Gentile (as Nicky Gentile) as Mafalda model and call girl
 Adolfo Celi as Judge
 Ennio Antonelli as Otello Rinaldi, the butcher, 'Manzotin'
 Luciano Bonanni as Fatebenefratelli Hospital's male nurse and horse gambler
 Aristide Caporale (as Aristide Caporali)
 Gianfranco Cardinali
 Giuseppe Castellano as Stelvio Mazza the Harness racing driver
 Renzo Ozzano as Jean Louis Rossini French harness racing champion driver
 Fernando Cerulli as TV commercial whisky "VAT 69" director
 Alberto Giubilo , famous Italian TV announcer of horse races, as himself

Production
In the opening credits, Gigi Proietti is credited as Luigi Proietti, his full name. The actor has also stated that following Ghost Whisperer to film, he feared he would really take up the habit of gambling.

In the scene of whisky Vat69 spot the actor who plays the director (Fernando Cerulli) is voiced by Steno, while the driver without a license is voiced by Mario Lombardini.

Sequel

The sequel was filmed in 2002, Febbre da cavallo - La mandrakata directed by Carlo Vanzina (son of Steno, whose real name was Stefano Vanzina), again starring Gigi Proietti.

References

External links

1976 films
1976 comedy films
Films directed by Stefano Vanzina
Italian comedy films
1970s Italian-language films
Films set in Rome
Films shot in Rome
Films about gambling
Italian horse racing films
Films scored by Fabio Frizzi
1970s Italian films